The Tenth Amendment may refer to the:
Tenth Amendment to the United States Constitution, part of the Bill of Rights
Tenth Amendment of the Constitution of India, which incorporated Dadra and Nagar Haveli
Tenth Amendment of the Constitution of Ireland, which permitted the state to ratify the Single European Act
Tenth Amendment of the Constitution Bill 1986, a failed attempt to amend the Constitution of Ireland
Tenth Amendment of the Constitution of South Africa